Megachile longuisetosa is a species of bee in the family Megachilidae. It was described by Gonzalez & Griswold in 2007.

References

Longuisetosa
Insects described in 2007